Allan Robert Smith (November 10, 1945 – August 7, 2002) was a Canadian professional ice hockey goaltender who played nearly 500 games in the National Hockey League (NHL) and World Hockey Association (WHA).

Minor-pro career
Smith began junior hockey in 1961 with the Toronto Marlboros. In 1962 he began playing for the Lakeshore Bruins of the OHA before rejoining the Marlboros in the 1964–65 season.

Late in the 1965–66 NHL season, Smith played two games with the Toronto Maple Leafs, winning one of them and posting a 1.94 goals against average. In 1966 he was sent to the Maple Leaf farm team in Victoria, British Columbia (also called the Maple Leafs) where he started 56 games. He was moved to the Western Hockey League's Vancouver Canucks for the 1967 playoffs, where he played in 6 games, posting a 2.61 GAA and got one shutout. That year he also appeared in one game for the San Francisco Seals in the WHL playoffs.

From 1967 to 1969 he played 85 games with the Tulsa Oilers, Rochester Americans, and Baltimore Clippers minor league teams before joining the Pittsburgh Penguins, being claimed from the Toronto organization in the Intra-League Draft on June 11, 1969.

Professional career
Smith started his NHL career with the Toronto Maple Leafs. During the 1965-66 season, Smith had quit the Toronto Marlboros to work for a hospital supply firm. Smith made his NHL debut for the Maple Leafs against the Chicago Black Hawks, when he relieved Gary Smith after 2:15 of play. He backstopped the Leafs to a 3–2 victory and stalled Bobby Hull at 47 goals. Smith was one of five goalies who played for the Maple Leafs during the 1966–67 regular season. He played one more game for the Maple Leafs on December 31, 1966, as part of a 5–1 losing effort against the Black Hawks. Smith was later called up as the back-up to Terry Sawchuk for games four and five of 1967 Stanley Cup Finals, due to an injury to Johnny Bower. Smith qualified to have his name engraved on the Stanley Cup, but Toronto left his name off, because he did not play in the playoffs.

Smith's other brief moment of glory for the Maple Leafs was participating in the 1968 NHL All-Star Game. He played in relief for Bruce Gamble and stopped 13 of 14 shots. He was claimed by the Pittsburgh Penguins in the intraleague draft.

Smith also played for the Pittsburgh Penguins, Detroit Red Wings, Buffalo Sabres, Hartford Whalers and Colorado Rockies. One of the most infamous moments of his career came on February 13, 1977, when he quit the Buffalo Sabres. Smith was to replace injured goalie Gerry Desjardins for a game against the Minnesota North Stars, and Buffalo had also called up Don Edwards. Less than an hour before gametime, Buffalo general manager Punch Imlach ordered Sabres coach Floyd Smith to play Edwards instead. After the national anthem, Smith stepped off the bench, saluted Buffalo owners Seymour and Northrup Knox and headed for the dressing room.

Smith later played in the World Hockey Association (WHA) with the New England Whalers where he was the WHA's top goaltender in 1978. A third team WHA All-Star for two consecutive years, many people in hockey felt Smith was robbed when snubbed by Team Canada for the 1974 Summit Series between WHA All-Stars and the Soviet Union national team. Overall, his career spanned from 1966 to 1981.

Transaction history
Smith was claimed from Toronto by Pittsburghs in National Hockey League intraleague draft, June 11, 1969, then from Pittsburgh by the Detroit Red Wings in the intraleague draft, June 8, 1971. He was subsequently selected by New England Whalers in 1972 World Hockey Association General Player Draft, February 12, 1972.

Smith was traded by the Red Wings to Buffalo for future considerations, March 10, 1975, then signed as free agent by New England August 15, 1977. His National Hockey League rights were retained by Whalers prior to the expansion draft, June 9, 1979. Finally he was traded by Whalers to the Colorado Rockies for cash, September 4, 1980.

Post-career
In 1981, Smith played 37 games for the Colorado Rockies and retired. He became a car salesman in Vancouver, and later headed to the British Columbia interior to pick fruit. Before returning to Toronto, Smith also was a salesman for Reuters.

Smith kept in touch with former WHA teammate Larry Pleau. When Pleau coached the Hartford Whalers in the NHL, he would leave Smith tickets at Maple Leaf Gardens.

Once he returned to Toronto, Smith engaged in his love of writing. Subjects would include sports, such as in his 1997 novel The Parade has Passed, featuring a WHA forward who hitchhikes to the funeral of his former coach, who had died in a brawl. Smith later wrote the play Confessions to Anne Sexton and the beginnings of a novel entitled, The Tragedy of Lake Tuscarora. To make ends meet, Smith became a taxi driver for Beck Taxi. It was not uncommon for Smith to pick up old friends and former teammates.

In 1998, Smith used the $34,000 of pension benefits he'd received as part of the NHL's settlement with former players to produce Confessions to Anne Sexton at the Alumnae Theatre on Berkeley Street in downtown Toronto. The play was about a former goalie who goes to New York City to attend an Impressionist art exhibit. On opening night, seventeen people attended the performance, the biggest house of the show's three-week run.

In the last few months of his life, Smith socialized with Jim Keon, the brother of Smith's former teammate Dave Keon. Before his death, Smith was still working on The Tragedy of Lake Tuscarora. Smith's son Adam said that his father was not a talented writer, and after reading the manuscript told his father on his deathbed that there were fourteen pages that were perfect and Smith was happy.

He died in 2002 as a result of pancreatic cancer.

Career statistics

Regular season and playoffs

Awards and honours
Accolades:
 Played in National Hockey League All-Star Game, 1968
 Played in World Hockey Association All-Star Game, 1972–73
 Named to World Hockey Association All-Star Third Team, 1972–73
 Played in World Hockey Association All-Star Game, 1973–74
 Named to World Hockey Association All-Star Third Team, 1973–74
 Played in World Hockey Association All-Star Game, 1974–75
 Won the Ben Hatskin Trophy (Top WHA Goaltender), 1977–78
 Named to World Hockey Association All-Star First Team, 1977–78
 Inaugural member of the World Hockey Association Hall of Fame, 2010

See also

References

External links

 

1945 births
2002 deaths
Baltimore Clippers players
Buffalo Sabres players
Canadian expatriate ice hockey players in the United States
Canadian ice hockey goaltenders
Colorado Rockies (NHL) players
Detroit Red Wings players
Hartford Whalers players
National Hockey League All-Stars
New England Whalers players
Pittsburgh Penguins players
Rochester Americans players
Ice hockey people from Toronto
Springfield Indians players
Stanley Cup champions
Toronto Maple Leafs players
Tulsa Oilers (1964–1984) players